John Notman (22 July 18103 March 1865) was a Scottish-born American architect, who settled in Philadelphia. He is remembered for his churches, and for popularizing the Italianate style and the use of brownstone.

Career
Notman was born on 22 July 1810 at Fernieside on the south edge of Edinburgh in Scotland. He was the son of David Notman, a mason and builder. He was educated at the Watt Institution in Edinburgh.

Around 1824 Notman joined his older cousin, William Notman to train as an architect in the office of William Henry Playfair in Edinburgh prior to emigrating to the United States in 1831. He eventually settled in Philadelphia, where one of his first commissions was Laurel Hill Cemetery in 1835.   He later opened and operated a successful firm until his death in 1865.  Notman was also a founding member of the American Institute of Architects and was committed to establishing professionalism in the practice of architecture in the United States.

Notman is credited with introducing the Italianate style to America. "Riverside", his 1837-39 house in Burlington, New Jersey for Bishop G.W. Doane, was tremendously influential, and his 1845 Athenaeum of Philadelphia was the first Italianate building in his adopted city. Notman designed a number of suburban villas and country houses, including "Ogontz" (1863) for financier Jay Cooke.

Many of his designs for churches were dictated by the ideas of the Cambridge Camden Society who suggested that Anglican churches of the Low church variety should be built in the Romanesque style, while those of the High church variety be built in the Gothic style.  He was also briefly employed by the Roman Catholic Diocese of Philadelphia during construction of the Cathedral Basilica of Saints Peter and Paul until an argument over the terms of his contract resulted in his dismissal.

Notman was also the architect of the highly influential New Jersey State Lunatic Asylum in Trenton, New Jersey of 1847.  This building was the first example of the Kirkbride Plan in asylum design.

Notman also designed the Italianate gatehouse for Mount Vernon Cemetery in Philadelphia, Pennsylvania.

Following Notman's death, the firm continued for a couple of years under his protege George Hewitt. He is buried in Laurel Hill Cemetery. John's brother, Peter Notman, lived on Joralemon Street in Brooklyn Heights and sold fire insurance. His children, John's nieces and nephews, are memorialized on a bas-relief in the crypt of St George's Episcopal Church on Stuyvesant Square in New York City.

Churches
 
Some of Notman's notable commissions for the Episcopal Church include:
Chapel of the Holy Innocents, Saint Mary's Hall, Burlington, New Jersey (1845).
St. Thomas Episcopal Church, Glassboro, New Jersey (1846)
Church of the Messiah, Richmond (1848)
St. Paul's Episcopal Church, Trenton, New Jersey (1848). Attributed to Notman.
St. Mark's Church, 1625 Locust Street, Philadelphia (1849). Tower completed by George Hewitt (1865). Lady Chapel by Cope & Stewardson (1899-1902).
Emmanuel Church, Cumberland, Maryland (1851).
St. Peter's Church, Pittsburgh (1851).
St. Clement's Church, Philadelphia (1855–59).
Church of the Holy Trinity, Rittenhouse Square, Philadelphia (1856–59).
Episcopal Church of the Messiah, District of Port Richmond, Philadelphia, PA (1847-8).
St. John's Episcopal Church, Wilmington, Delaware (1857-1858); located in the Brandywine Village Historic District.
Cathedral Church of St. John the Evangelist, Concord Ave. & Market St., Wilmington, Delaware (1858).

Gallery

Further reading
Constance M. Greiff, John Notman Architect, 1810-1865. Philadelphia: Athenaeum of Philadelphia, 1979.
Carla Yanni, The Architecture of Madness: Insane Asylums in the United States, University of Minnesota Press, 2007.

References

External links

Philadelphia Buildings
Catalogue of Notman's works and biography
Episcopal Church of the Messiah, Port Richmond

1810 births
1865 deaths
Architects from Philadelphia
British emigrants to the United States
Burials at Laurel Hill Cemetery (Philadelphia)
Royal Scottish Academicians
19th-century American architects
Architects from Edinburgh